EcoSCART is a technology available for audio-video equipment which is connected to a television set by an SCART cable.

A device that embeds the ecoSCART function goes to standby or wakes up automatically, per the status of the TV. The first device in which ecoSCART was implemented was the TDT adapter zapbox EH-M2.

EcoSCART's saves energy by preventing a television from operating while turned off; and to lessen its use by automatically putting the TV in external mode.

External links
 EH-M2 Metronic
 For more details about the registration of the brandname and logo, search "ecoscart" in the INPI page here  which is the official body that regulates the intellectual property in France.

Film and video technology